Gymnothorax pseudomelanosomatus is a species of fish from the Gymnothorax genus native to Taiwan in the Pacific. It has a long and plain body with fawn colored fins.

References 

pseudomelanosomatus
Fish described in 2015